Manuela Di Centa,  (born 31 January 1963) is a former Italian cross-country skier and Olympic athlete. She is the sister of former cross-country skier Giorgio Di Centa and cousin of former track and field athlete Venanzio Ortis.

Career
Di Centa, born in Paluzza, province of Udine, to a family of Nordic skiers, made her debut on the Italian national team in 1980 at the age of 17, skied with the G.S. Forestale. Two years later, she competed at the FIS Nordic World Ski Championships in Oslo finishing in eighth place. After a quarrel with the president of the Italian Skiing Federation, Di Centa left the national team, not returning until 1986.

At the 1988 Winter Olympics in Calgary, she finished sixth in the 20 km freestyle. She won her first medals in international competition at the 1991 World Championships in Val di Fiemme: a silver (4 × 5 km relay) and two bronzes (5 km, 30 km). An Olympic medal followed in 1992, a bronze in the 4 × 5 km relay. In 1993, at the Falun World Championships, she won two more silvers (30 km, 4 × 5 km relay). At the 1995 FIS Nordic World Ski Championships, she won another silver (30 km) and a bronze (5 km).

Di Centa also became Italian national champion in fell running in 1985, 1989 and 1991.

Di Centa seemed confined to the role of the eternal second, but this changed abruptly at the 1994 Winter Olympics in Lillehammer, where she medaled in all five cross-country events: two gold, two silver and one bronze medal. The same year she also won her first aggregate Cross-Country Skiing World Cup, a feat she repeated in 1996.

In 1996 she was the first Italian cross-country skier to receive the Holmenkollen Medal. Her last title was a bronze at the 1998 Winter Olympics in the 4 × 5 km relay.

After retiring, Di Centa worked for Italian television (RAI), and became a member of the Italian and International Olympic Committees.

Di Centa became the first Italian woman to climb Mount Everest (with supplementary oxygen) in 2003.

Di Centa is the first Italian woman (and the 19th Italian) to compete at five Olympics, which she did from 1984 to 1998.

Her younger brother Giorgio is currently a member of the Italian national cross-country ski team and was the winner of two gold medals at the 2006 Winter Olympics.

At the 2018 Winter Olympics di Centa was inducted into the Olympians for Life project.

Her niece, Martina, competed for Italy at the 2022 Winter Olympics in Cross-country skiing.

Di Centa is a vegan.

2006 Winter Olympics
As a member of the International Olympic Committee and the Italian National Olympic Committee (CONI) and as one of Italy's most accomplished Winter Olympic athletes, Di Centa played a prominent public role in the 2006 Winter Olympics in Turin. She was one of the eight flag bearers during the Opening Ceremonies. At the Closing Ceremonies, she participated in the awarding of medals to the winners of the men's 50 km cross-country race. Coincidentally, the gold medal winner was her younger brother Giorgio.

Cross-country skiing results
All results are sourced from the International Ski Federation (FIS).

Olympic Games
 7 medals – (2 gold, 2 silver, 3 bronze)

World Championships
 7 medals – (4 silver, 3 bronze)

World Cup

Season standings

Individual podiums

15 victories 
35 podiums

Team podiums

 1 victory – (1 )
 9 podiums – (8 , 1 )

Note:  Until the 1999 World Championships and the 1994 Olympics, World Championship and Olympic races were included in the World Cup scoring system.

National titles
Italian Mountain Running Championships
Mountain running: 1985, 1989, 1991 (3)

Politics
Manuela Di Centa, who has been vice-president of the National Council of the Italian National Olympic Committee (CONI) until 2006, is also involved in politics and was a member of the Chamber of Deputies for Forza Italia, between 2006 and 2013. She became a member of the International Olympic Committee in 1999 and remained there until 2010.

Doping allegations
The Swedish investigative television program Uppdrag granskning claimed that Di Centa had an exceptionally high hemoglobin level prior to a World Cup in Lahti in 1997. Di Centa's hemoglobin value was measured in an official pre-competition test as high as 17.3 g/dL. The allowed limit to start in official FIS competition is 16.5 g/dL.

See also
List of athletes with the most appearances at Olympic Games
Italian sportswomen multiple medalists at Olympics and World Championships

References

External links
 
 Holmenkollen medalists - click Holmenkollmedaljen for downloadable pdf file 
  

1963 births
Living people
People from Paluzza
Cross-country skiers at the 1984 Winter Olympics
Cross-country skiers at the 1988 Winter Olympics
Cross-country skiers at the 1992 Winter Olympics
Cross-country skiers at the 1994 Winter Olympics
Cross-country skiers at the 1998 Winter Olympics
Holmenkollen medalists
International Olympic Committee members
Italian female cross-country skiers
Italian female mountain runners
Olympic cross-country skiers of Italy
Olympic gold medalists for Italy
Olympic silver medalists for Italy
Olympic bronze medalists for Italy
Italian summiters of Mount Everest
Olympic medalists in cross-country skiing
FIS Nordic World Ski Championships medalists in cross-country skiing
FIS Cross-Country World Cup champions
Medalists at the 1998 Winter Olympics
Medalists at the 1994 Winter Olympics
Medalists at the 1992 Winter Olympics
Sportspeople from Friuli-Venezia Giulia